David Michael Butler (born July 17, 1965) is a former American football linebacker who played for the Cleveland Browns in 1987. He played college football at University of Notre Dame.

References 

1965 births
Living people
American football linebackers
Notre Dame Fighting Irish football players
Cleveland Browns players
People from Ridgewood, New Jersey
Sportspeople from Bergen County, New Jersey